Johan Coenraad Froneman, SC (born 10 February 1953) is a South African former judge who served as a Justice of the Constitutional Court of South Africa.

Early life

Froneman grew up in Cathcart and was educated at Grey College, Bloemfontein, Stellenbosch University and the University of South Africa. He obtained his law degree from the University of South Africa in 1977. He did his military service with the Cape Field Artillery. He commenced practice as an advocate in 1980 and took silk in 1990.

Judicial career

In 1994, Froneman was appointed as a judge of the Eastern Cape Provincial Division of the Supreme Court, now known as the Eastern Cape High Court, Grahamstown. In 1996 he was appointed the first Deputy Judge President of the newly established Labour Court and Labour Appeal Court, a position which he held until 1999. In 2002 he served as an acting judge in the Supreme Court of Appeal.

In October 2009, he was appointed to the Constitutional Court by President Jacob Zuma.  He retired on 31 May 2020.

Other positions

Froneman was an extraordinary professor in public law at the University of Stellenbosch from 2003 to 2008 and held visiting appointments at Harvard University and the University of Oxford during periods of judicial leave.

References

Judges of the Constitutional Court of South Africa
20th-century South African judges
Alumni of Grey College, Bloemfontein
Stellenbosch University alumni
University of South Africa alumni
People from East London, Eastern Cape
South African Senior Counsel
Afrikaner people
1954 births
Living people
21st-century South African judges